Department of Forests and Wildlife may refer to one of the following state government departments in India:

 Department of Forests and Wildlife (Kerala)
 Department of Forest and Wildlife (Punjab)